Dániel Gyurta (born 4 May 1989) is a Hungarian former competitive swimmer who mainly competed in the 200-metre breaststroke. In 2016, Gyurta became a member of the International Olympic Committee (IOC), he is a member of the European Olympic Committees (EOC) Athletes' Commission since 2013 and a member of the Athletes Commission since 2016.

Biography
Gyurta was born in Budapest. When he was 15 years old, he won a silver medal (with 2.10.80) in the men's 200-metre breaststroke at the 2004 Summer Olympics in Athens, Greece.

His coaches are Sándor Széles, Ferenc Kovácshegyi and Balázs Virth.
On August 12, 2008 he set an Olympic record in the preliminaries of the 200-metre breaststroke at the 2008 Olympic Games in Beijing. His record was broken one day later by Kitajima in the semi-finals. Gyurta finished fifth in the final.

At the 2009 World Aquatics Championships he won gold medal in 200 m breaststroke, edging out Eric Shanteau in the last meters. He was named Hungarian Sportsman of the year for this achievement.

Two years later Gyurta retained the gold medal at the 2011 World Aquatics Championships, thus becoming the second man to defend the world title on 200 metre breaststroke after David Wilkie of Great Britain, who won the first two world titles, in 1973 and 1975.

At the 2012 London Olympics he won the gold medal and set a new world record for the 200 m breaststroke.
After the race, he offered a replica of his Olympic medal to the parents of his former competitor Alexander Dale Oen in tribute to him, a gesture much appreciated by Dale's family. Dale had died on 30 April 2012, a few months before the Games. Later, Gyurta received the international Fair Play Award from UNESCO, in respect of his medal tribute of a fallen fellow breaststroker: Alexander Dale Oen.

His younger brother, Gergely Gyurta is also a competitive swimmer.

Personal bests
In long course swim pools Gyurta's bests are:

 100 m breaststroke: 59.53 (29 July 2012, London) Hungarian Record 
 200 m breaststroke: 2:07.23 (2 August 2013, Barcelona) Championship Record, European Record

In short course pools Gyurta's best's are:

 50 m breaststroke: 27.00 (10 December 2009) Hungarian Record
 100 m breaststroke: 56.72 (11 December 2009, Istanbul) Hungarian Record 
 200 m breaststroke: 2:00.48 (31 August 2014, Dubai) Former World Record

Awards
   Order of Merit of the Republic of Hungary – Knight's Cross (2004)
 Hungarian swimmer of the Year (5): 2004, 2009, 2011, 2012, 2013
 Hungarian Junior Athlete of the Year (2) - the National Sports Association (NSSZ) awards: 2004, 2007
 Junior Príma award (2008)
 Hungarian Sportsman of the Year (3) - votes of sports journalists: 2009, 2012, 2013
   Order of Merit of the Republic of Hungary – Officer's Cross (2010)
 Best Youth Hungarian Athlete of the year (1) - the National Sports Association (NSSZ) awards: 2011
 Best Hungarian Junior Sportman of the Year (Héraklész) (1): 2011
   Order of Merit of Hungary – Commander's Cross (2012)
 UNESCO Fair Play Award (2013)
 Swimming World Magazine – European Swimmer of the Year (1): 2013
 Hungarian university athlete of the year (1): 2015
 Honorary Citizen of Újpest (2016)

References

External links
 

1989 births
Living people
Swimmers from Budapest
Male breaststroke swimmers
Hungarian male swimmers
Olympic swimmers of Hungary
Swimmers at the 2004 Summer Olympics
Swimmers at the 2008 Summer Olympics
Swimmers at the 2012 Summer Olympics
Swimmers at the 2016 Summer Olympics
Olympic gold medalists for Hungary
Olympic silver medalists for Hungary
World record setters in swimming
World Aquatics Championships medalists in swimming
Medalists at the FINA World Swimming Championships (25 m)
European Aquatics Championships medalists in swimming
Medalists at the 2012 Summer Olympics
Medalists at the 2004 Summer Olympics
European champions for Hungary
Olympic gold medalists in swimming
Olympic silver medalists in swimming
International Olympic Committee members
20th-century Hungarian people
21st-century Hungarian people